Pharmacogene Variation Consortium (abbreviated as PhamVar) is an international group of experts that maintains a systematic nomenclature system for allelic variations of genes that affect the metabolism of drugs.

The database is focused on cytochrome P450 enzymes, but is being expanded into other classes of enzymes.  The original nomenclature was maintained by the Human CYP Allele Nomenclature Database.  However PhamVar took over this function in 2017.

See also 
 PharmGKB
pharmacogenetics
pharmacogenomics
pharmacokinetics
pharmacodynamics
 Clinical Pharmacogenetics Implementation Consortium

References 

Biological databases